The RD-855 (GRAU Index 8D68M), also known as the RD-68M, is a four-nozzle liquid-fuel rocket vernier engine, burning N2O4 and UDMH in a gas generator cycle. It was used on the R-36, Tsyklon-2 and Tsyklon-3 first stage as thrust vector control by gimbaling of its nozzle. The engine is distributed through a cylindrical structure that is integrated around the main engine RD-251 module. The structure includes aerodynamic protection for the nozzles and small retro engines to assure the separation of the first stage. The engine was ignited two second before the RD-251 main engine.

The engine was serially produced between 1965 and 1992. It was first launched on December 16, 1965 on an R-36 and its last launch was on January 30, 2009 with the last launch of the Tsyklon-3. The production capability was restarted for the Tsyklon-4 but with the apparent cancellation of the program the engine would still be out of production.

See also
R-36 – The Soviet ICBM for which the RD-855 was created.
Tsyklon-2 – A Soviet small rocket that uses the RD-855.
Tsyklon-3 – A Soviet small rocket that uses the RD-855.
Tsyklon-4 – A Ukrainian small rocket project that would have used the RD-855.
Yuzhnoe Design Bureau – The RD-855 designer bureau.

References

External links
 Yuzhnoye Design Bureau English-language home page
 Yuzhmash Home Page

Rocket engines of the Soviet Union
Rocket engines using hypergolic propellant
Rocket engines using the gas-generator cycle
Yuzhmash rocket engines
Rocket engines of Ukraine